The Whitechapel and St George's by-election, 1930 was a parliamentary by-election held on 3 December 1930 for the British House of Commons constituency of Whitechapel and St George's in the Metropolitan Borough of Stepney.

Vacancy 
The seat had become vacant when the constituency's Labour Member of Parliament (MP), Harry Gosling, died on 24 October 1930.  He had been MP for the seat since a 1923 by-election.

Electoral history 
The constituency was a Labour/Liberal marginal that had been won by Labour at every election from 1922 onwards. Usually the Unionists had not fielded a candidate but intervened at the last election, helping to split the ant-Labour vote and give Labour its biggest ever win here;

Candidates 

The Labour candidate was 53-year-old J. H. Hall. He was contesting his first parliamentary election. He was an Alderman of neighbouring Stepney Borough Council, and was employed as a foreman by the Port of London Authority. He was sponsored by the Transport and General Workers' Union, like his predecessor.

The Liberal candidate selected on 3 November 1930 was 38-year-old Barnett Janner. He had been Liberal candidate for Cardiff Central at the 1929 election, where he had finished third. Later in the year he moved to Hendon, north London, and took up employment as company secretary and solicitor for his father-in-law's business. In 1926 he was elected to the Board of Deputies of British Jews, and subsequently became a member of the executive of the English Zionist Federation. Janner's Jewish background was thought ideal as the Jewish population made up a third of the constituency. In September 1930, before Gosling had died, Liberal leader, David Lloyd George had identified Janner as a suitable candidate. However, there were other Liberals who had been in the running to win the candidate nomination, notably local councillor and social worker, Miss Miriam Moses.

The Conservative Party candidate was 24 years old Loel Guinness. He had contested the seat for the Conservatives in the 1929 general election.

The Communist candidate was 40-year-old Harry Pollitt, the Party's new General Secretary. He had stood against the Prime Minister, Ramsay MacDonald, at Seaham in the 1929 general election.

Campaign 
Although the Liberal party was not expecting to overturn such a large Labour majority, they hoped to do well enough in the by-election to help encourage the party in the rest of the country. Lloyd George ensured that the Liberal's campaign was sufficiently funded through the 'Lloyd George Fund'.

Janner campaigned in opposition to the government's policy on Palestine. On 20 October 1930, the Labour government's Passfield white paper was issued, which proposed the introduction of severe restrictions on Jewish immigration to Palestine. This went down particularly well in the Whitechapel area of the constituency. 

The TGWU were worried that the Labour candidate would lose Jewish support and the seat because of the government's white paper. The Union's Secretary, Ernest Bevin met with Dov Hoz and the visiting Jewish Labour movement in Palestine, the Poale Zion, who were unhappy about the government's proposals. He persuaded them to publicly back the Labour candidate, which put them in conflict with many members of the British Poale Zion. Dov Hoz agreed to share a platform with Bevin and Hall at a Labour campaign rally. At the meeting, following the speech from Bevin, Hoz got up to speak and was howled down by the audience. The meeting became so disrupted that the police were called in to restore order. Hoz accused the Liberal candidate Janner, of exploiting the white paper for his own political ends.

Result 

Despite a massive swing to the Liberals, Hall held onto the seat on a much reduced majority;

Hall blamed the fall in the Labour vote on the economic difficulties faced by the Labour Government, and on a "flood of misrepresentation" from the government's opponents.

Aftermath 
Hall held the seat until Janner took it for the Liberals at the 1931 election. Guinness was elected MP for Bath at the same elections;

See also
 Whitechapel and St George's constituency
 1923 Whitechapel and St George's by-election
 1942 Whitechapel and St George's by-election
 List of United Kingdom by-elections
 United Kingdom by-election records

References
 
 

Whitechapel and St George's by-election
Whitechapel and St George's,1930
Whitechapel and St George's,1930
Whitechapel and St George's by-election
Whitechapel
Whitechapel and St George's by-election